Cherry Red Records Stadium may refer to:

 Plough Lane Stadium (2021–), current stadium of AFC Wimbledon
 Kingsmeadow Stadium (2002–20), during AFC Wimbledon's ownership of the stadium